Jenny Shin (born 7 October 1992) is a South Korean professional golfer.

Shin was born in Seoul, South Korea, and moved to the United States aged 9. She won the U.S. Girls' Junior in 2006.

Shin turned professional in 2010. She played on the Futures Tour in 2010, winning The International at Concord in July and finishing 4th on the money list to earn her LPGA Tour card for 2011. She has played on the LPGA Tour since, with her first win at the 2016 Volunteers of America Texas Shootout.

Amateur wins
2006 U.S. Girls' Junior
2009 AJGA Heather Farr Classic

Professional wins (2)

LPGA Tour (1)

LPGA Tour playoff record (0–1)

LPGA Futures Tour (1)
2010 The International at Concord

Results in LPGA majors
Results not in chronological order before 2019.

^ The Evian Championship was added as a major in 2013.

CUT = missed the half-way cut
DQ = disqualified
WD = withdrew
NT = no tournament
"T" = tied for place

Summary

Most consecutive cuts made – 19 (2012 U.S. Open – 2016 ANA)
Longest streak of top-10s – 1 (twice)

References

External links

Seoul Sisters profile

South Korean female golfers
LPGA Tour golfers
Golfers from California
Golfers from Seoul
People from Torrance, California
South Korean emigrants to the United States
1992 births
Living people
20th-century South Korean women
21st-century South Korean women